The Oscawana station was a commuter rail stop on the New York Central's Hudson Line, located in the hamlet of Crugers, New York. The station closed in 1973.

History 
This station was closed by Penn Central on July 2, 1973, along with Manitou, Chelsea and New Hamburg, due to low ridership.

References

External links 
 Former Oscawana Station (Road and Rail Pictures)

Former New York Central Railroad stations
Railway stations in Westchester County, New York
Railway stations closed in 1973
1973 disestablishments in New York (state)